Karl Anton Sandström (born 23 December 1981) is a Swedish curler.

Teams

References

External links
 
 
 

Living people
1981 births
Swedish male curlers
Swedish curling champions
21st-century Swedish people